She's Missing (originally titled Highway) is a 2019 drama film directed by Alexandra McGuinness and starring Lucy Fry and Eiza González. The film premiered at the Virgin Media Dublin International Film Festival in March 2019.

Plot

The abduction of a rodeo queen and military wife sends her best friend on a search through the hostile desert and a host of unseemly characters.

Cast
Lucy Fry as Heidi
Eiza González as Jane
Christian Camargo as Lyle
Josh Hartnett as Ren
Blake Berris as Gus
Sheila Vand as Cherry
Antonia Campbell-Hughes as Marina
C. J. Wallace as Taylor
Olivia Spinelli as Chalet

Production
Principal photography began on mid-July 2017 in Ruidoso, Albuquerque, and Moriarty, New Mexico.  Filming wrapped in August 2017.

Reception

References

External links
 

2019 films
2010s female buddy films
American female buddy films
Films shot in New Mexico
2010s English-language films
2010s American films